María Guadalupe Mondragón González (born 7 November 1958) is a Mexican politician affiliated with the PAN. As of 2013 she served as Deputy of the LXII Legislature of the Mexican Congress representing the State of Mexico. She also served as Senator during the  LXI Legislature.

References

1958 births
Living people
Politicians from San Pedro, Coahuila
Women members of the Senate of the Republic (Mexico)
Members of the Senate of the Republic (Mexico)
Members of the Chamber of Deputies (Mexico)
National Action Party (Mexico) politicians
21st-century Mexican politicians
21st-century Mexican women politicians
Women members of the Chamber of Deputies (Mexico)